Vaughn Jefferis (born 20 May 1961 in Huntly) is a New Zealand horseman who won a bronze medal at the Olympic Games.

Initially competing in showjumping Jefferis switched to Eventing in 1990 and had immediate success, being part of the gold medal team at the World Equestrian Games in Stockholm riding Enterprise. Jefferis purchased Bounce in 1994 and rode the horse for the remainder of his international career. They won the world individual title in 1994 at The Hague, a bronze medal in the team event at the 1996 Summer Olympics, the team gold at the 1998 World Championships in Rome.  Their last event was at the 2000 Summer Olympics in Sydney but they did not complete the event.

Biography
Unlike the majority of his team-mates, such as Mark Todd, Andrew Nicholson and Blyth Tait, who based themselves in England, Jefferis remained in New Zealand throughout his career. After retiring in 2000 he has concentrated on producing and training horses.

In August 2008, Jefferis announced he was making a comeback to top-level eventing, and would aim for the 2012 London Olympics.

References
 Vaughn Jefferis plans comeback for London Olympics – 4 August 2008 – Horsetalk.co.nz

External links
 
 
 

Australian event riders
1961 births
Living people
Olympic bronze medalists for New Zealand
Olympic equestrians of New Zealand
New Zealand male equestrians
Equestrians at the 1996 Summer Olympics
Equestrians at the 2000 Summer Olympics
Olympic medalists in equestrian
Sportspeople from Huntly, New Zealand
Medalists at the 1996 Summer Olympics